The 2000 cricket season was the 101st in which the County Championship has been an official competition. Surrey in first-class cricket and Gloucestershire in limited overs cricket were the dominant teams. The West Indies toured England to compete in a test series which England won 3–1. Zimbabwe also played their first test series on English soil losing 1–0.

Honours
County Championship - Surrey
NatWest Trophy - Gloucestershire
National League - Gloucestershire
Benson & Hedges Cup - Gloucestershire
Minor Counties Championship - Dorset
MCCA Knockout Trophy - Herefordshire
Second XI Championship - Middlesex II 
Wisden - Mark Alleyne, Martin Bicknell, Andrew Caddick, Justin Langer, Darren Lehmann

Test series
England played five Test matches against West Indies following two against Zimbabwe.

West Indies tour

Zimbabwe tour

County Championship

National League

NatWest Trophy

Benson & Hedges Cup

Leading batsmen
Michael Bevan topped the averages with 1124 runs @ 74.93

The top runscorer was Darren Lehmann with 1477 @ 67.13

Leading bowlers
Courtney Walsh topped the averages with 40 wickets @ 11.42

The leading wicket taker was Glenn McGrath, playing for Worcestershire, who took 80 @ 13.21

References

External links
 CricketArchive – season and tournament itineraries

Annual reviews
 Playfair Cricket Annual 2001
 Wisden Cricketers' Almanack 2001

English cricket seasons in the 20th century
2000 in English cricket